Squariel may refer to:

 Ariel Square Four motorcycle
 Squarial, a square-shaped satellite TV aerial used by BSB in the UK